Ruakura is a semi-rural suburb of Hamilton City, in the Waikato region of New Zealand. The University of Waikato is nearby.

The area lies to the east of urban Hamilton and to the west of State Highway 1B (a variant of State Highway 1 which avoids the urban area).

Ruakura Agriculture Research Centre

Waikato Agricultural College and Model Farm was set up in 1888, so that Ruakura is now synonymous with the Ruakura Agriculture Research Centre, the location of institutes such as AgResearch and Plant & Food Research. Areas of AgResearch's research at Ruakura include animal molecular biology (genomics and cloning), reproductive technologies, agricultural systems modelling, land management, dairy science, meat science, food processing technology and safety, and animal behaviour and welfare. Plant & Food Research's site in Hamilton is home to its blueberry nursery, its Bioengineering Group and its Food and Biological Chemistry laboratory. Work is also carried out on biological control agents and plant fertilizer (Ruakura solution). The Waikato region is a major contributor to New Zealand's agricultural-based economy, and Ruakura has an important role in that industry.

The Ruakura Agriculture Research Centre is on land owned by the Waikato Tainui, to whom it was returned by the Crown as part of their 1995 Waikato Raupatu Land Settlement.

The Waikato Regional Council included a majority of the land at Ruakura in the proposed Regional Policy Statement (PWRPS) as a future employment area. The Hamilton City Council Proposed District Plan gave effect to the PWRPS incorporating the Ruakura structure plan. The long-term plan for Ruakura is that it will be New Zealand's largest integrated commercial and lifestyle development anchored by a freight and logistics hub.

Demographics 

Ruakura had a population of 1,158 at the 2018 New Zealand census, an increase of 258 people (28.7%) since the 2013 census, and an increase of 327 people (39.4%) since the 2006 census. There were 189 households, comprising 549 males and 612 females, giving a sex ratio of 0.9 males per female. The median age was 20.6 years (compared with 37.4 years nationally), with 132 people (11.4%) aged under 15 years, 666 (57.5%) aged 15 to 29, 312 (26.9%) aged 30 to 64, and 48 (4.1%) aged 65 or older.

Ethnicities were 61.1% European/Pākehā, 13.7% Māori, 5.4% Pacific peoples, 27.2% Asian, and 4.4% other ethnicities. People may identify with more than one ethnicity.

The percentage of people born overseas was 39.1, compared with 27.1% nationally.

Although some people chose not to answer the census's question about religious affiliation, 51.0% had no religion, 30.8% were Christian, 0.8% had Māori religious beliefs, 5.7% were Hindu, 2.3% were Muslim, 2.1% were Buddhist and 3.1% had other religions.

Of those at least 15 years old, 240 (23.4%) people had a bachelor's or higher degree, and 51 (5.0%) people had no formal qualifications. The median income was $10,400, compared with $31,800 nationally. 105 people (10.2%) earned over $70,000 compared to 17.2% nationally. The employment status of those at least 15 was that 300 (29.2%) people were employed full-time, 174 (17.0%) were part-time, and 69 (6.7%) were unemployed.

In the 2018 census a new Ruakura area was created, covering the University and a rural area on the city fringe. Up to 2013 Ruakura was part of the  Newstead area, which covered a similar area, but excluded the university. As shown below, the change resulted in a much larger, younger and poorer population in 2018 than previously and younger than the 37.4 years of the national average. 61.1% were European, 27.2% Asian and 13.7% Māori. Only 3 people lived in meshblock 0955300, at the Research Centre, in 2013.

Education 
Tai Wananga is a co-educational state secondary school located in Ruakura.

The school teaches primarily in the Māori language.

Both schools are coeducational. Rolls are as of

Ruakura Junction railway station 

Ruakura had a railway station from 1 October 1884 to 1 January 1967 at the junction of the East Coast Main Trunk and the Cambridge Branch. The branch had its first public train on 8 October 1884. When the line opened, Ruakura station was described as an island in a swamp, with no road connection. In 2020 reopening as a "passenger rail Metro Station" was put forward as a COVID-19 recovery scheme, as part of a $150m scheme to relay tracks to Cambridge.

Employment area and Inland port 
In 2016 approval was given to create an employment area, with an inland port, served by the railway and the Hamilton Bypass. Opening was planned in 2021. In 2021, further developments for Ruakura have been planned to expand it as a residential and logistics suburb, in addition to integrating Ruakura Road into the Waikato Expressway and improving business between regions outside of Waikato.

Residential areas 
The 2016 Structure Plan included residential development to the north and south of the employment areas.

Greenhill Park 
Greenhill Park is a medium density suburb at the north west of the development, begun in 2016, It adjoins Fairview Downs. A 110kV transmission line was undergrounded in 2020 to make way for more housing.

See also
Murashige and Skoog medium
Long Ashton solution
List of streets in Hamilton

References

External links
Ruakura website
AgResearch website
Information on AgResearch's campuses – AgResearch is a Crown Research Institute owned by the New Zealand Government.
Street map of Ruakura from the Hamilton City Council site

Populated places in Waikato
Suburbs of Hamilton, New Zealand
Science and technology in New Zealand